Mad Mod is a fictional character appearing in American comic books published by DC Comics. The character is known as one of the first recurring villains of the Teen Titans.

Publication history
Mad Mod first appeared in Teen Titans #7 and was created by Bob Haney and Nick Cardy.

Fictional character biography
One of the first villains to menace the Teen Titans, Mad Mod (real name Neil Richards) was a Carnaby Street fashion designer with no actual superpowers of his own. His assumed name is derived from the popular Mod style in England at the time. He used his label as a front to smuggle goods inside his clothing. After being foiled, he later hatched a plot to steal the Queen of Britain's scepter, but was stopped as well by the Titans.

The character disappeared following the cancellation of the original Teen Titans and was absent from the 1980–1994 series written by Marv Wolfman. The character resurfaced in the Dan Jurgens-written Teen Titans series of the mid-1990s, as an ally of the Mr. Jupiter-backed version of the Titans. The character was shown having renounced crime and designed the Jurgens Titans team's costumes. The character's clothing lines would later be referenced on occasion in various Teen Titans books, with the implication that Mod is a popular clothing designer on par with other real world fashion designers in the DC Universe.

In 2011, "The New 52" rebooted the DC Comics universe. Mad Mod was a member of a group known as "Diablo", that seeks to prevent the original Teen Titans from regaining their memories of their original incarnation of the group. Mad Mod is portrayed as a hipster figure as opposed to a "mod" complete with a handlebar mustache, much younger than his pre-New 52 incarnation. Mad Mod interrogates the super-heroine Bumblebee after her husband is kidnapped by Mister Twister who Diablo seeks to stop. When Mad Mod realizes that the Titans have regained their memories of their past activities, Mad Mod orders the team killed in order to stop Mister Twister from using them in an occult ritual.

Powers and abilities
During the Mad Mod's heyday as a villain, he would match his outrageous clothing with a way out approach in his intricate but deadly traps. He would employ a gang of thugs to do most of the handiwork that needed muscle.

Mad Mod term
The term "Mad Mod, Poet God" was used by Peter Milligan for the unrelated DC character Shade, the Changing Man. Another unrelated DC character is the Mad Mod Witch from The Unexpected, later revealed to be a resident of the Dreaming known as "the Fashion Thing".

Other versions
In the alternate future seen in "Titans Tomorrow", the Titans Tomorrow battled Mad Mod's synthetics. They later mentioned that they killed Mad Mod.

In other media

Television

 Mad Mod appears in Teen Titans, voiced by Malcolm McDowell. This version is an old man, Anglophile, and technological genius known for utilizing robots, hypnotic holographic projectors, death traps, and surreal, psychedelic, 1960s-styled landscape-inspired illusions all controlled by his ruby-studded cane, which also allowed him to drain a victim's youth on one occasion, who views the Teen Titans as rebellious "snots". Throughout the series, he frequently attempts to "educate" the Titans in what he sees as proper behavior, only to be foiled by them each time. In the fifth season, Mad Mod joins the Brotherhood of Evil in their plot to rid the world of young heroes, only to be eventually flash-frozen along with them by the Titans.
 Mad Mod appears in the "New Teen Titans" segment of DC Nation Shorts. This version possesses a machine resembling the TARDIS capable of manipulating time and his age.
 Mad Mod appears in the Teen Titans Go! episode "Salty Codgers". This version possesses the ability to drain victims' youth.

Film
Mad Mod makes a non-speaking cameo appearance in Teen Titans Go! To the Movies.

Video games
 Mad Mod appears as an unlockable character in the Teen Titans video game's "Master of Games" mode, voiced by Greg Ellis.
 Mad Mod appears in Scribblenauts Unmasked: A DC Comics Adventure.

Miscellaneous
 Mad Mod appears in issue #8 of the Teen Titans Go! tie-in comic book series.
 Mad Mod appears in the Batman: The Brave and the Bold tie-in comic book series and takes inspiration from the Teen Titans animated series version.

References

Characters created by Bob Haney
DC Comics supervillains
Comics characters introduced in 1967
DC Comics titles
Fictional inventors
Fictional people from London
Mod (subculture)